Wyandotte may refer to:

People and culture
 Wyandotte Nation (also Wyandot), a federally recognized Native American tribe in Oklahoma
 Wyandot language, the extinct language, now under revitalization efforts, of the Wyandotte Nation

United States geographic names  
 Wyandotte, Arkansas, an historical community in Hot Spring County, Arkansas
 Wyandotte, California
 Wyandotte, Indiana
 Wyandotte, Kansas, a mid-19th-century settlement and neighborhood of Kansas City, Kansas; see Kansas Pacific Railway
 Wyandotte, Louisville, Kentucky, a neighborhood 
 Wyandotte, Michigan
 Wyandotte, Oklahoma
 Wyandotte Caves, park and its caverns in southern Indiana
 Wyandotte County, Kansas
 Wyandotte Township, Pennington County, Minnesota

Other
 Wyandotté (novel), by James Fenimore Cooper
 Wyandotte chicken, a breed

See also

 Huron (disambiguation)
 Huron-Wendat (disambiguation)
 Wendat (disambiguation)
 Wyandot (disambiguation)
 

Language and nationality disambiguation pages